Syncopacma cinctella is a moth of the family Gelechiidae. It is found in all of Europe, Asia Minor and North Africa. In the east, the range extends through Siberia to the Russian Far East.

The wingspan is 10–14 mm. The forewings are bronzy-black; a nearly straight narrow white fascia beyond middle. Hindwings are fuscous, darker posteriorly. Under-surface with white fascia appearing only as a costal spot on forewings. The larva is pale green, suffused with reddish head pale yellow-brown; 2 with four black semilunules filled with yellow-brown.

Adults are on wing from June to August.

The larvae feed on Lotus corniculatus. The larvae live between leaves spun together with silk.

References

External links
Swedish Moths
lepidoptera.pl
Fauna Europaea

Syncopacma
Moths described in 1759
Moths of Europe
Insects of Turkey
Taxa named by Carl Alexander Clerck